Drogheda was a parliamentary borough constituency in Ireland, which returned one Member of Parliament (MP) to the House of Commons of the Parliament of the United Kingdom. It was an original constituency represented in Parliament when the Union of Great Britain and Ireland took effect on 1 January 1801, replacing the Drogheda constituency in the Irish House of Commons.

Boundaries
This constituency was the parliamentary borough of Drogheda in County Louth.

Members of Parliament

Elections

Elections in the 1830s

North's death caused a by-election.

 Stooks Smith gives the poll as 237 for O'Dwyer and 12 for Ball, but Walker's numbers have been used above.

On petition, O'Dwyer was unseated for "want of qualification", causing a by-election.

 Stooks Smith gives the poll as 313 for O'Dwyer and 130 for Plunkett but Walker's figures have been used here. On petition, O'Dwyer's election was declared void and Plunkett was declared elected, on 21 June 1835.

Elections in the 1840s

Elections in the 1850s

Elections in the 1860s

Polling for the 1868 election was marred by riots at or outside the polling house, during which people were fired upon by the military, and one man was seriously injured. Although this was later not shown to have affected the result significantly, on petition, Whitworth was unseated for separate findings of an "organised system of intimidation and force was established by Mr. Whitworth and his friends and agents."

Elections in the 1870s

Elections in the 1880s
O'Leary's death caused a by-election.

References

The Parliaments of England by Henry Stooks Smith (1st edition published in three volumes 1844–50), 2nd edition edited (in one volume) by F.W.S. Craig (Political Reference Publications 1973)

Westminster constituencies in County Louth (historic)
Constituencies of the Parliament of the United Kingdom established in 1801
Constituencies of the Parliament of the United Kingdom disestablished in 1885
Drogheda